Ewen Fernandez (born 17 February 1989) is a French speed skater.

Fernandez competed at the 2014 Winter Olympics for France. In the 1500 metres he finished 40th overall, and in the 5000 metres he was 18th. He was also a member of the French team pursuit squad, which lost its quarter-final to the Netherlands, and then lost Final D to the United States, finishing 8th.

As of September 2014, Fernandez's best performance at the World Single Distance Speed Skating Championships is 19th, in the 2012 5000 metres.

Fernandez made his World Cup debut in November 2011. As of September 2014, Fernandez has one World Cup podium finish, winning a silver medal in a mass start race at Kolomna in 2012–13. His best overall finish in the World Cup is 12th, in the mass start in 2012–13.

In 2017, he was the winner in Paris, Jeonju, Incheon, Frankfort and P2P.

World Cup Podiums

References 

1989 births
Living people
French male speed skaters
Speed skaters at the 2014 Winter Olympics
Olympic speed skaters of France
People from Saint-Lô
Sportspeople from Manche
Competitors at the 2017 World Games
Inline speed skaters